Events from the year 1611 in art.

Events
 The painter Agostino Tassi rapes his pupil Artemisia Gentileschi.

Paintings

Marcus Gheeraerts the Younger - Frances Howard, Countess of Hertford
Hendrik Goltzius - Mercury
Frans Hals - Jacobus Zaffius (his first known painting)
Peter Paul Rubens - The Elevation of the Cross (triptych, Cathedral of Our Lady (Antwerp), completed 1610–11)
Joachim Wtewael - Perseus and Andromeda

Births
February 24 (bapt.) - William Dobson, English portrait painter (died 1646)
March 15 - Jan Fyt, Flemish animal painter and etcher (died 1661)
April 17 - Simone Pignoni, Italian painter of both licentious then later pious works (died 1698)
August 4 - Jan van den Hoecke, Antwerp painter and draftsman (died 1651)
date unknown
Nicolas Baudesson, French flower painter (died 1680)
Giovanni Battista Bolognini, Italian painter and engraver (died 1668)
Charles Alphonse du Fresnoy, painter (died 1665)
Pietro Testa, Italian High Baroque artist (died 1650)
Giovanni Francesco Cassana, Italian portrait painter (died 1691)
Baldassare Franceschini, late Italian Baroque painter of frescoes (died 1689)
Muyan,  Chinese Chan monk and calligrapher (died 1684)
Diego Quispe Tito, Peruvian painter, leader of the Cuzco School of painting (died 1681)
Francesco Guarino, Italian painter active mainly in the mountainous area east of Naples called Irpinia (died 1651/1654)
Francesco Quaini, Italian painter of quadratura (died 1680)
probable
Antonio de Pereda, Spanish painter (died 1678)
Sebastiano Mazzoni, Italian who painted with unresolved dynamism and from awkward perspectives (died 1678)
Willem van de Velde the Elder, Dutch painter  (died 1693)
Fra Bonaventura Bisi, Italian painter (died 1662)
 (born 1611/1612) - Hendrick Cornelisz. van Vliet – Dutch painter (died 1675)

Deaths
January - Anton Möller, German painter (born 1563)
August - Bartholomeus Spranger, Flemish Northern Mannerist painter, draughtsman, and etcher (born 1546)
date unknown
Luigi Benfatto, Italian painter, nephew of Paolo Veronese (born 1551)
Sun Kehong, Chinese landscape painter, calligrapher, and poet (born 1533)
Camillo Mariani, Italian sculptor of the early Baroque (born 1565)
Barthélemy Prieur, French sculptor (born 1536)
Sampson Strong, Dutch-born portrait painter (born 1550)
Nicolas van Houy, Dutch Golden Age painter (born 1550)
Marco Vecellio, Italian painter, nephew of Titian (born 1545)
probable 
Ludovico Buti, Italian painter active mostly in Florence (born 1560)
Jan Soens, Dutch painter from 's-Hertogenbosch (born 1547)

References

 
1610s in art